Hans Christopher Brofeldt (born 21 February 1982) is an American actor, poet, and activist, currently residing in Venice, Los Angeles. Hans is known for numerous film and television roles, including John Baker in the movie Dreamland (2019); Randy Weaver (his film debut) in Paramount's six-part mini-series Waco (2018); and most recently for his role of Nicholls in AMC's The Walking Dead (2021).

Early life
The son of a Swedish doctor and an American flight attendant, Hans was born February 21, 1982, in Northern California but spent the first year of his life in Playa Del Rey, Los Angeles before moving to Sacramento, where he was raised. After graduating high school he attended Cal State Long Beach studying pre-med before deciding upon a career in acting.

Career
Hans began his acting career doing print and commercial work while also studying acting in Los Angeles. His first film role was in a 2012 short film called The Take. Between 2012 and 2017 he appeared in a more than a dozen more short films, including Far Between, Light of Night, and Lockdown.

In 2017 he made his first television appearance guest starring as Randy Weaver in Paramount's Waco miniseries starring Michael Shannon and Taylor Kitsch. His first major film role was in Dreamland (2019), which debuted at the Tribeca Film Festival featuring Margot Robbie and Travis Fimmel, where he played alcoholic patriarch John Baker. In 2019 he also appeared in Progeny and the upcoming The Purple Iris (directed by Arif Khan). He's also appeared in Lifetime's Model Citizen, renamed A Deadly Price for Her Pretty Face, as the monstrously abusive Nick Archer, NBC's Midnight, Texas; and Hulu's Light as a Feather. Recently Hans was seen in a 6-episode arc playing the role of Auge in the final season of TNTʼs drama series Animal Kingdom. Additionally, Hans is starring in the interactive feature, Immortality, from BAFTA award-winning director Sam Barlow, which debuted at Tribeca Film Festival and was released in August.

He has a number of projects set to be released in 2022 including a featured role in the romantic heist comedy, Marmalade, starring Joe Keery and Aldis Hodge. Additionally he booked roles in A24ʼs The Curse, by Safdie brothers and Nathan Fielder starring Emma Stone and Showtimeʼs American Gigolo starring Jon Bernthal.

Filmography

Film

Television

Video games

References

External links
 

1982 births
American male film actors
American male television actors
Living people
People from California
21st-century American male actors
American people of Swedish descent